WAVP (1390 AM) is a radio station licensed to Avon Park, Florida. WAVP is owned by Ferris Waller, through licensee Walco Enterprises, LLC, and operates with 1,000 watts day and 77 watts at night. The station is known on-air as Boss Hogg Radio.

History & current status

WAVP began broadcasting October 1, 1970. In 1992, the owner was Andrew Banas who bought the station for $100,000 in September 1990. The station went silent on October 1, 2009, according to FCC records, but was resurrected in early 2010.

WFHT until January 2015 aired a nationally syndicated talk show lineup that included Rick and Bubba, Neal Boortz, Michael Savage, Mark Levin, and Phil Hendrie Mondays through Fridays, and specialty talk shows on the weekends. WFHT was also an affiliate of the Tampa Bay Rays baseball team, the Tampa Bay Lightning hockey team, and NFL and NCAA football games; the former talk station also featured local talk show hosts Dale Pflug and Lester Lob. In 2015, WFHT began broadcasting Florida A&M Rattlers football games via the "Rattler Football Network".

From 2015 to 2020, the station broadcast an Urban AC/Black Gospel format. This ended when the station was sold to Walco Enterprises and began simulcasting the other three Boss Hogg Radio stations owned by the company, reclaiming the WAVP call letters it had used for most of its history until the mid-2000s.

Translators
In addition to the main station, WAVP is relayed by an FM translator.

References

1992 Broadcasting Yearbook, page A-66 (listed as WAPR)

External links

 

AVP
Radio stations established in 1970
1970 establishments in Florida
Adult hits radio stations in the United States